Cis boleti  is a species of beetle in family Ciidae. Cis boleti is a tiny beetle  (2,8–4 mm in length) uniformly brown beetle which lives in tree fungus. For instance, within the fruit bodies of Piptoporus betulinus and Trametes. It is one of many very similar species, which are very difficult to identify and separated  mostly by differences in the male genitalia.. It is found in Europe and East across the Palearctic to Japan.

References

Ciidae
Beetles described in 1763
Taxa named by Giovanni Antonio Scopoli